Jökulsá is a river in Southeast Iceland in Austur-Skaftafellssýsla in the middle of Breiðamerkursandur, a glacial outwash plain.

It connects the glacier lake Jökulsárlón with the sea, the Atlantic Ocean. The river is very short, at the moment about 500 m, it was still 1.500 m of length in 1989, but its length was 1.000 m around the year 1900, when it discharged directly the Breiðamerkurjökull glacier, the lake beginning to form not before 1935–40. The lake grew very fast from 1950 on and changed the course of the river. The medium discharge today is 250–300 m³/s. From time to time, icebergs from the lake enter the river.

Erosion could with time break down the spits and connect the glacier lake with the sea, forming a fjord. The government fights the erosion, by stabilising the shoreline of the sea and also of the river, not least in order to save the road.

Jökulsárlón Bridge
The Hringvegur crosses the river over a bridge, which would not be of special interest, but at this place the sea is eroding the coast fast and threatening the road by this. If the road were destroyed, East Iceland would be shut off from Reykjavík.

The bridge is built from concrete and around 90 m long. It dates from 1967. Before, the river crossing was very dangerous. Many people preferred to cross the glacier tongue instead. A boat ferry existed from 1932 on.

References

Rivers of Iceland